Leucanopsis quadrata is a moth of the family Erebidae. It was described by Walter Rothschild in 1910. It is found in Peru and Bolivia.

References

quadrata
Moths described in 1910